Jacksonian may refer to:

Jacksonian Democrats, party faction
Jacksonian democracy, American political philosophy 
Jacksonian seizure, in neurology